Ayas Jan (also Romanized as Ayās Jān; also known as Ayāz Jān, Yāsgūn, and Yāstagān) is a village in Beyza Rural District, Beyza District, Sepidan County, Fars Province, Iran. At the 2006 census, its population was 1,009, in 239 families.

References 

Populated places in Beyza County